is a passenger railway station in located in Sakai-ku, Sakai, Osaka Prefecture, Japan, operated by West Japan Railway Company (JR West).

Lines

Station layout
The station consists of two opposed side platforms connected by an elevated station building. The station is staffed.

Platforms

History
It was renamed  on August 1, 1941, and to its present name on May 1, 1944. With the privatization of the Japan National Railways (JNR) on April 1, 1987, the station came under the aegis of the West Japan Railway Company.

Station numbering was introduced in March 2018 with Asaka being assigned station number JR-R27.

Passenger statistics
In fiscal 2019, the station was used by an average of 2223 passengers daily (boarding passengers only).

Surrounding area
 Yamato River
 Sakai Women's Junior College
 Kaorigaoka Liberte High School
 Sakai Liberal Junior and Senior High School
 Sakai City Asakayama Junior High School

See also
List of railway stations in Japan

References

External links

 Asaka Station information 

Railway stations in Osaka Prefecture
Railway stations in Japan opened in 1937
Sakai, Osaka